Arctous alpina (syn. Arctostaphylos alpina), the alpine bearberry, mountain bearberry or black bearberry, is a dwarf shrub in the heather family Ericaceae. The basionym of this species is Arbutus alpina .

Description

The leaves are alternate and wither in the autumn but remain on the plant for another year. The leaves are stalked and are oval with serrated margins and a network of veins. They often turn red to scarlet in autumn. They have five sepals, five fused petals with five small projecting lobes, ten stamens and a single carpel. This plant flowers in June.

Distribution and habitat
Arctous alpina has a circumpolar distribution. It is found at high latitudes, from Scotland east across Scandinavia, Russia, Alaska, Northern Canada and Greenland. Its southern limits in Europe are the Pyrenees and the Alps, in Asia, the Altay Mountains and Mongolia, and in North America, British Columbia in the west, and Maine and New Hampshire in the east. Its natural habitat is moorland, dry forests with birch and pine and hummocks covered in moss at the edges of bogs.

Ecology
Arctous alpina forms a symbiotic relationship life with fungi which supply it with nutrients such as phosphorus. The berries are appreciated by birds.

References

External links

USDA Plants Profile for Arctostaphylos alpina (alpine bearberry)
 University of Michigan—Dearborn: Native American Ethnobotany for Arctostaphylos alpina — traditional medicinal and culinary uses.
Isle of Skye Flora
Flora of North America treatment of Arctous alpina

Arbutoideae
Alpine flora
Flora of Europe
Flora of North America
Flora of temperate Asia
Plants described in 1753
Taxa named by Carl Linnaeus
Plants used in traditional Native American medicine
Threatened flora of the United States